Roots Industries India Limited is an Indian automobile brand and is the first largest auto horn manufacturer in the world. The company manufactures a wide range of products which includes industrial cleaning systems, scrubber driers, vacuum cleaners, golf carts, electric carts, 14 seater electric buses, electric trikes, and battery operated vehicles. It was founded in 1970 by K. Ramasamy.

References

External links

Roots Industries honks for Safety

Companies based in Coimbatore
Manufacturing companies established in 1970
Indian brands
Home appliance manufacturers of India
Auto parts suppliers of India
Manufacturing companies of India
Kick scooters
1970 establishments in Tamil Nadu
Indian companies established in 1970